Richard Boyce may refer to:

Richard Boyce (bishop) (1928–2020), bishop in the Anglican Church in North America
Rick Boyce, early marketeer in the commercialization of the World Wide Web
Dick Boyce, Canadian political candidate
Sir Richard Boyce, 2nd Baronet (1929–1968), of the Boyce baronets

See also
Boyce (disambiguation)